The 1994–95 EHF Women's Cup Winners' Cup was the nineteenth edition of EHF's competition for women's handball national cup champions. It ran from October 7, 1994, to May 6, 1995. The Preliminary round was expanded to a Round of 32, with Belarus and Georgia debuting in the competition.

In a second straight German-Hungarian final, Dunaferr Dunaújváros defeated 1993 champion TV Lützellinden to win its first European trophy, becoming the third Cup Winners' Cup champion from Hungary and ending a streak of five lost finals by Hungarian teams in the competition since 1981.

Results

References

Women's EHF Cup Winners' Cup
1994 in handball
1995 in handball